SOREA Band is a K-pop Girl Group that bases their music on Traditional Korean musical instruments. They mix Korean traditional music with a variety of genres like Pop music and Jazz and communicate with the world through Korean ethnic music.

Their music has been used to advertise corporations such as Samsung Electronics, Hyundai Motors and LG Optimus G) and has been aired on Korean public TV MBC's 'Infinite Challenge’, K-Drama ‘Princess Hours’, and KBS ‘1 Night 2 Days’.
SOREA Band's music has also been broadcast overseas through PBS, NBC, HBO, BBC, NHK, and Brazil HBO Latin American through programs and advertisements.

SOREA Band has been invited to the White House to perform, conducted the first solo concert held at the Blue House and participated at the Mayor's Thames Festival in London, Champs Libres Festival in Strasbourg, France and a concert at Point Éphémère(France). In South Korea they have been selected for casting at events such as government official meetings and events.
They have also performed various concerts in China, Japan, and Hong Kong.

Members

Performances
SOREA had a celebration concert for congratulating Kimoon Ban on his victory at UN Secretary General election in 2006. SOREA had a special invitation performance at the Mayor’s Thames Festival in London, 2009. The band also held a concert at Point Éphémère in Paris, 2010.

SOREA has gained interest from a lot of people as a modern Korean traditional music band possessing both musical quality and public popularity by performing at the very first concert held at the Blue House since it became publicly open in 2008 and at other occasions as well.  It also made its lead producer the winner of the advanced intellectual person in Korea award.  Its original composing "Beautiful Korea" was reckoned with its musical quality and was selected to be included in the music textbooks of junior high school.

SOREA has been chosen as an honorary ambassador to represent Ministry for Health, Welfare, and Family Affairs for 2010–2011, following Kim Yuna (Representative of 2009).

In 2011, SOREA's "Restart the Show" was selected as the title theme for the Kimchi Chronicles, 13 episodes of Korean food and travelogue series by PBS. SOREA is evangelizing Korean traditional music and traditional culture to the foreigners in the world by diligently working as a representative of traditional Korean art.  SOREA's been persistently presenting newly arranged traditional beats and melodies with the slogan of modernizing, globalizing, and making Korean traditional art more publicly popular.

Identity and Symbol 
The phrase, "SOREA", comes from the phrase "Soul of Korea" and it represents the Korean cultural art.

SOREA Band is Korea's leading music group that runs with the slogan of “Modernization, Popularization and Globalization of Korean Music” and pioneering a new genre of combining various components of Korea's culture and trends of the world. SOREA Band has spread their music world-widely and SOREA Band's music has stood alongside the world-famous music like Samba, Celtic Music, Reggae and Tango.

Awards and Records 
 Selected as an honorary ambassador of the Ministry of Health and Welfare in 2011
 Selected as a 'advanced intellectual person in Korea' in 2010 (Ministry of Public Administration and Security)
 Win a Grand prize of donation in 2010 (Director of National Assembly)
 Named on Honorary ambassador for 'Ministry for Health, Welfare and Family Affairs' in 2010 (after Kim Yuna) 
 "Beautiful Korea" selected to be included in Junior High School music textbooks in 2010
 Korea Sparkling Festival Achievement Award in 2009
 21C Korean Music Project Participation Prize 21C in 2009
 Selected for Han style supplementary business by the ministry of culture, sports, tourism in 2009
 Best New Album Award received from Ministry of Culture, Sports, and Tourism(MCST) Secretary in 2006 
 Culture and Art Development Project, creative program section at Arts Council Korea in 2006

History

Sole concert
 "Sharing the Culture Together" concert in 2011 (held by Sejong Center for the Performing Arts)
 SOREA Concert in 2010 at Incheon Cultural Center
 SOREA Concert in 2009 at The Monsters’Theatre SOREA Concert At The Monsters’Theatre
 Charity Concert in 2009 at The Merry Hall (In the Seogang University)
 Invited for SOREA concert from Korea University in 2009
 The Very First Concert At The Blue House in 2008 (Presidential Event)
 SOREA Concert in 2008 at the Starry Night Concert At the Sejong Art Center
 Showcase at Club Catch light in 2006.  Guests:  SG Wannabe, M to M, Haul, etc.
 SOREA concert in 2006 at U Myun Dang, National Gugak Center.  Promoted on MBC.
 SOREA concert in 2006 at Jindo Namdo Gugak Center

Principal Concert Log
 Special guest performance at the Korean, Chinese, and Japanese Health Ministry Summit in 2010 (Held by the Ministry of Health and Welfare)
 Special guest performance at the opening ceremony for Korean Economist Contest in 2010 (Held by World-OKTA)
 Performed at the welcome ceremony for the president of Uzbekistan in 2010 (asked by President Lee)
 Special guest performance at Cinema digital Seoul opening show in 2009
 Performed at the 42nd anniversary show of Industrial Safety and Public Health Day in 2009
 Special guest performance at the Seoul Motor Show in 2009
 60 th Constitution Day Official National Event in 2008 (Invited, President acc.)
 Special guest performance at Jeonju Sound Festival at Iksan Park in 2008
 Special guest sole performance at Seoul Namsan Poongryu Madang Festival in 2008 (official event in Seoul)
 Special guest performance at the opening of Seoul Poongmool Market in 2008 (official event in Seoul)
 Special guest performance at Reopenning Festival in Boramae Park in 2008 (official event in Seoul)
 Special performance at Ernst & Young's Best Quality Company show in 2008 (sponsored by Ministry of Knowledge Economy, MBC, Maeil Economy, and Korea Exchange)
 SOREA Concert With Extreme Crew At the Gyeongju World culture Expo in 2007
 Special guest performance at the 11th Asia Pacific conference of German Business in 2007
 Special performance at Jinju Innovative City's groundbreaking ceremony in 2007 (official event by the president)
 Special guest performance at the 6th HUPO's symposium in 2007
 SOREA Celebration Concert of Ban Kimoon elected as UN Secretary-General in 2006
 Special performance at 560th anniversary event for Korean day held by Hoonminjungem Distribute in 2006 (special stage at King Sejong's grave)
 Special guest performance at the celebration ceremony for the National Foundation Day in 2006 (official event by the president sponsored by the Ministry of Government)

Overseas
 Selected Theme Song for PBS TV special documentary on Korea "Kimchi Chronicles" in 2011 
 Strategic alliance formed with Poly from China in 2011 (music, concert promotion, management in China, etc.)
 Special guest performance in 2010 at the dinner show held by the Chamber of Commerce and Industry in Singapore
 Paris, France: Concert At Club Point Ephémère in 2010 
 Strasbourg, France: Concert At Champs Libres Festival in 2010 
 London, England: Concert At The Mayor's Thames Festival "A Scoop of Korea" Performance in 2009 
 Harbin, China: Sole Concert in 2008 (Kookmin Bank invitation)
 Shenzen, China: SOREA Performance in 2008 (Supported by Shenzen Korea Association, Samsung Fire Insurance)
 Las Vegas, United States of America: AVING Special on 'CES 2007'
 Tokyo, Japan: SOREA Concert At the Club Heights in 2006 (Yahoo Japan sponsored)
 Shanghai, China: Sole Concert At the Lyceum Theater in 2006 (Supported by Shanghai Consulate general, Korea Tourism Organization)
 Tokyo, Japan: Nakano Hall Single Concert in 2006 (Korean Culture Center invitation, Supported by the Ministry of Foreign Affairs And Trade)
 Germany Worldcup: Concert Tour - Frankfurt, Weimar, Leipzig, Stuttgart in 2006 (FIFA Fanfest invitation)
 Taiwan Mobile Forum in 2006 (Invited, Samsung Supervised)
 Tokyo, Japan: Tokyo media & Artshobi live house Showcase in 2006
 Hochimin, Vietnam: SOREA Performance in 2006 (Invited, Supported by Hochimin Center, Korea Foundation)
 France: Participated in International Music Exhibition MIDEM 2006 (Selected by KOCCA - Korea Culture & Content Agency - as a best album)
 Almaty, Kazakhstan: "Dynamic Korea" in 2005 (Invited by Kazakhstan Embassy in Korea)

Albums

References

External links 
 

2005 establishments in South Korea
K-pop music groups
Musical groups established in 2005
Musical groups from Seoul
South Korean dance music groups
South Korean girl groups